Natalia Regiment was a Citizen Force infantry regiment of the South African Infantry.

History

Origin
This unit could trace its origins back to a Natal Law for the protection of the colony, namely Law No 19 of 1862 which instructed the establishment of a rifle association. The name of this rifle association was changed during the UDF era to the Pietermaritzburg Commando. By the 1940s, the commando was headquartered at the Pietermaritzburg Drill Hall and was shared by another unit during that era, namely the Natal Carbineers.

From Commando to Regiment
In 1981, the commando was converted to a regiment as an infantry battalion under the Citizen Force, being renamed as the Natalia Regiment.

Operations
Its responsibility included border duties along the Mozambique border with Natal as well as operational duties in South West Africa. The regiment would deploy its tactical HQ to Jozini, for operations around the Makathini Flats.

Disbandment
Natalia Regiment was disbanded around 1998.

Commanding officers
Commandant R. Dick 1981-1986
Commandant P. Hardman 1986-1993
Lt Colonel P. Brough 1993-1995
Lt Colonel D. de Beer 1995
Note: This list does not include Officers Commanding of the previous Pietermaritzburg Commando.

Insignia

Dress Insignia
The regiment did not have a distinctive beret badge and wore the Infantry Corps Springbok badge. The Shoulder flash was inherited from the Pietermaritzburg Commando with the Southern Cross star formation.

References

External links

Infantry battalions of South Africa
Infantry regiments of South Africa
Military units and formations established in 1981
Military units and formations of South Africa in the Border War
Military units and formations of South Africa
Military units and formations disestablished in 1998